Alta Floresta (Portuguese for "High Forest") is a municipality in Mato Grosso, Brazil.

The municipality is served by Piloto Osvaldo Marques Dias Airport.

The municipality contains a small part of the  Cristalino State Park, created in 2001.

References

External links

Tour Guide to Alta Floresta

Municipalities in Mato Grosso